Hassan Yousry (born 10 May 1978) is an Egyptian handball player. He competed in the men's tournament at the 2004 Summer Olympics and at the 2008 Summer Olympics.

References

1978 births
Living people
Egyptian male handball players
Olympic handball players of Egypt
Handball players at the 2004 Summer Olympics
Handball players at the 2008 Summer Olympics
21st-century Egyptian people